Free Samples is a 2012 American independent comedy starring Jess Weixler and Jesse Eisenberg. It was the first film directed by Jay Gammill and the first film  written by Jim Beggarly.

Plot
Jillian (Weixler), a Stanford Law School dropout rebelling by opting out of the family business, wakes up after a night of drinking with no recollection and is tasked with giving out free samples from an ice cream vendor truck.

Cast
 Jess Weixler as Jillian
 Jesse Eisenberg as Tex/Albert
 Jason Ritter as Wally
 Halley Feiffer as Nancy
 Tippi Hedren as Betty
 Keir O'Donnell as Danny
 Jocelin Donahue as Paula
 Whitney Able as Dana

Release
The film a premiered at Tribeca Film Festival on April 20, 2012, and given a video-on-demand release on May 21, 2013, and a theatrical release on May 31, 2013.

References

External links

 

Free Sample mobile app on Playstore

2012 films
2012 comedy films
American comedy films
2010s English-language films
2010s American films